Gaydar (a portmanteau of gay and radar) is a colloquialism referring to the intuitive ability of a person to assess others' sexual orientations as homosexual, bisexual or straight. Gaydar relies on verbal and nonverbal clues and LGBT stereotypes, including a sensitivity to social behaviors and mannerisms like  body language, the tone of voice used by a person when speaking, overt rejections of traditional gender roles, a person's occupation, and grooming habits.

The detection of sexual orientation by outward appearance or behavior is challenged by situations in which masculine gay men do not act in a stereotypically gay fashion, or in which metrosexual men (regardless of sexuality) exhibit a lifestyle, spending habits, and concern for personal appearance stereotypical of fashionable urban gay men. For women, a tomboy might be mistaken for being butch, or a gay woman might act and appear in traditionally feminine ways.

Scientific research 

A number of scientific studies have been conducted to test whether gaydar is real or just a popular myth. Perhaps the earliest study asked people to judge sexual orientation from video clips, with results concluding that it was a myth. A later study in the Journal of Personality and Social Psychology showed that people could judge sexual orientation more accurately than chance. This study asked people to indicate their sexual orientation using the Kinsey scale and then had others view very brief silent clips of the people talking using thin-slicing. The viewers rated their sexual orientations on the same scale and the researchers found a significant correlation between where the people said they were on the scale and where they were perceived to be on the scale. Later studies have repeated this finding and have even shown that home videos of children can be used to judge accurately their sexual orientation later in life.

Later studies found that gaydar was also accurate at rates greater than chance for judgments just from the face. Study participants use gendered facial cues and stereotypes of gay people to make their judgments, but reliably misjudge sexual orientation for people countering stereotypes. The ethnicity, and nationality of neither the person making the judgment nor the person they are judging seems to make a difference when making judgments from faces. Even individual facial features (just the eyes) can sometimes give enough information to tell whether a man or woman is gay, straight, or lesbian. One study showed that judgments of men's and women's faces for about 1/25 of a second was enough time to tell whether they were gay, straight, or lesbian. People's judgments were no more accurate when they had more time to make their judgments. Follow-up work to this suggested that gaydar happens automatically when someone sees another person and that seeing someone’s face automatically activates stereotypes about gays and straights. People seem not to know that they have gaydar, though. Gay men have more accurate gaydar than straight men, and women have more accurate gaydar when they are ovulating. One study hypothesized that this might be because homosexual people are more attentive to detail than heterosexual people are, apparently as an adopted perceptual style aiding in the recognition of other homosexual people.

Other studies have found that men and women with body shapes and walking styles similar to people of the opposite sex are more often perceived as gay.

A study by UCLA assistant professor Kerri Johnson found that observers were able to accurately guess the sexual orientation of men 60 percent of the time, slightly better than would be achieved by random chance; with women, their guesses didn't exceed chance. Gender-specific body movements are not reliably associated with a person's sexual orientation; this is true of face shape, but surprisingly not for voices, even though people think they are associated with a person's sexual orientation. A handful of studies have investigated the question of gaydar from the voice. They have found that people can tell who is gay and straight from their voices, but have mostly focused on men (sometimes terming the vocal difference "gay lisp"). Detailed acoustic analyses have highlighted a number of factors in a person's voice that are used, one of which is the way that gay and straight men pronounce "s" sounds.

Research by William T. L. Cox and his colleagues proposed that "gaydar" is simply an alternate label for using LGBT stereotypes to infer orientation (e.g., inferring that fashionable men are gay). This work points out that the scientific work reviewed above that claims to demonstrate accurate gaydar falls prey to the false positive paradox (see also the base rate fallacy), because the alleged accuracy discounts the very low base rate of LGBT people in real populations, resulting in a scenario where the "accuracy" reported above in lab studies translates to high levels of inaccuracy in the real world.

Electronic device 
In the early 2000s, an electronic device based on the Japanese Lovegety wireless dating device was marketed as 'Gaydar' and reported on widely in the media. This was a keychain-sized device that would send out a wireless signal, alerting the user via a vibration, beep, or flash when a similar device was within . This lets the user know that a like-minded person was nearby.

Artificial intelligence 
Stanford University researchers Michal Kosinski and Yilun Wang carried out a study in 2017 which claimed that a facial recognition algorithm using neural networks could identify sexual orientation in 81% of the tested cases for men and 74% with women by reviewing photos of online dating profiles. Kosinski voiced concern about privacy and the potential for misuse of AI, and suggested that his findings were consistent with the prenatal hormone theory of sexual orientation, which hypothesizes that levels of androgens exposure in the womb help determine whether a person is straight, bisexual or gay. PHT predicts that gay and straight individuals may choose to present themselves differently on their profile pictures or have different facial appearance. 

Two replication studies confirmed the main findings of this study.  It also found that even when faces are blurred it is possible to classify sexual orientation. 

A blog post criticized the study for using photos from an uncontrolled environment. Rather than picking up on the facial structure, it was likely the algorithm was identifying factors in grooming, lifestyle, and photo angle; a small set of questions about differences including makeup use, facial hair, and eyeglass use was nearly as accurate as of the original study.

See also 

 Biometrics
 Biology and sexual orientation (physical differences)
 Electropsychometer
 Fruit machine (homosexuality test)
 
 Straight-acting

References

Further reading
Gaydar by Donald F. Reuter

External links 
 Public Radio Program on gaydar
 The Science of Gaydar: The new research on everything from voice pitch to hair whorl

LGBT slang
1990s slang
2000s slang
2010s slang
Stereotypes of LGBT people